Latentemys is an extinct genus of podocnemidid turtle. It is known from Miocene aged sediments of the Moghara Formation in Egypt.

References 

Podocnemididae
Prehistoric turtle genera